Miloš Nikić ( born 31 March 1986 in Cetinje, SR Montenegro, Yugoslavia) is a Serbian volleyball player (Wing-spiker).  He was part of the Serbia and Montenegro men's national volleyball team at the 2006 FIVB Volleyball Men's World Championship in Japan. He was a member of the Serbian national team at the 2008 Summer Olympics in Beijing and 2012 Summer Olympics in London. He plays for Italian club DHL Modena Volley.

Career

Clubs

Sporting achievements

Clubs

National championships
 2015/2016  Italian Cup, with DHL Modena Volley

National team
 2016  FIVB World League

References

External links
 FIVB profile

Living people
1986 births
Sportspeople from Cetinje
Serbian men's volleyball players
Fenerbahçe volleyballers
Olympic volleyball players of Serbia
Volleyball players at the 2008 Summer Olympics
Volleyball players at the 2012 Summer Olympics
Serbia and Montenegro men's volleyball players
Serbs of Montenegro
European champions for Serbia
Serbian expatriate sportspeople in Montenegro
Serbian expatriate sportspeople in Italy
Serbian expatriate sportspeople in Belgium
Serbian expatriate sportspeople in Russia
Serbian expatriate sportspeople in Turkey
Serbian expatriate sportspeople in Qatar
Serbian expatriate sportspeople in Argentina